Phrynoponera gabonensis is an Afrotropical species of ant in the subfamily Ponerinae. P. gabonensis is the most common, widely distributed and frequently encountered member of the genus Phrynoponera. Specimens are usually retrieved from leaf litter samples but also occur in pitfall traps. The species is known to nest in and under rotten wood, in compacted soil and in termitaries.

Synonyms
Phrynoponera gabonensis var. striatidens (Santschi, 1914)
Phrynoponera armata (Santschi, 1919)
Phrynoponera gabonensis var. robustior (Santschi, 1919)
Phrynoponera gabonensis var. esta Wheeler, 1922
Phrynoponera gabonensis var. fecunda Wheeler, 1922
Phrynoponera gabonensis var. umbrosa Wheeler, 1922
Phrynoponera heterodus Wheeler, 1922

References

External links

Ponerinae
Insects described in 1892
Hymenoptera of Africa